Agantuk is a 1991 Bengali-language drama film written and directed by Satyajit Ray. Notable for being Ray's last film, it was based on one of his own short stories, Atithi. A joint Indo-French production, it received financial backing from companies such as Gérard Depardieu's DD Productions and Canal+.

Plot summary 
Anila Bose, who lives in Calcutta, receives a letter from someone claiming to be her long lost uncle, Manomohan Mitra. He writes that he is visiting India after 35 years abroad and, as Anila is his only surviving relative, wants to meet her before he sets off again. Anila looks forward to it, but her husband, Sudhindra, is suspicious. The uncle arrives and stays. He says that he is an anthropologist who has traveled all over the world, and immediately wins the friendship of their son, Satyaki.

Anila suddenly remembers her grandfather's will, and Sudhindra is quick to suspect that the man calling himself Manomohan has come only to claim his share of the inheritance. Anila also starts to doubt his identity, while their son truly believes that he is who he claims to be.

The central conflict of the film rests upon the identity of the man and the family's struggle to determine it. Sudhindra subjects the visitor to various tests, such as looking at his passport. However, the visitor embarrasses Sudhindra and later his friend Rakshit by his ability to read minds. In a final attempt to establish the truth, Sudhindra invites a lawyer friend to gently question the guest. This is when the visitor reveals his deep knowledge, rich experiences and profound views of life, impressing Anila and Sudhindra. However, things turn ugly as the lawyer's frustration builds up until he orders the guest to "either come clean or just clear out". The next morning, the visitor is gone. Desperate to find him and win him back, the family finally learns that he is in fact Manmohan Mitra, and has visited the executor of the will. The couple apologises and persuades him to return. Back in Calcutta, after he leaves for Australia, the couple learn that Manmohan has given them his share of the inheritance.

Cast 
Utpal Dutt	... Manomohan Mitra / The Agantuk
Deepankar De ... Sudhindra Bose
Mamata Shankar ...	Anila Bose
Bikram Bhattacharya ... Satyaki Bose

Dhritiman Chatterjee ... Prithwish Sen Gupta
Rabi Ghosh ... Ranjan Rakshit

Subrata Chatterjee ... Chhanda Rakshit
Promode Ganguly ... Tridib Mukherjee
Ajit Bandyopadhyay ... Sital Sarkar

Production 
Agantuk was to become Satyajit Ray's last film. He died on 23 April 1992, at the age of 70. The film was a joint Indian-French production with financial backing from Gérard Depardieu's DD Productions, Canal+ and a couple of other French companies. Depardieu is credited as executive producer.

Reception
The film was critically acclaimed upon its release. The film ranked 2nd on Cahiers du Cinéma's Top 10 Films of the Year List in 1992. Leah Garchik of San Francisco Chronicle wrote the film "is a fitting ending to Ray's 30-film career -- it was Film of the Year in India in 1992 -- a strong and underlined summing- up statement about capital-M Man and capital-C Civilization." Hal Hinson of Washington Post wrote the film "shows all the virtues of a master artist in full maturity." Vincent Canby of New York Times wrote about the film "A small, gentle, exquisitely realized comedy about, among other things, family loyalties and trust in a world in which traditions have been devalued."

Awards 
At the 1992 Indian National Film Awards, Agantuk won the awards for Best Feature Film and Best Directing, and the Special Jury Award went to Mamata Shankar for her portrayal of Anila. At the Ritwik Ghatak awards, it was named the Best Film, while Ray was named the Best Scenario Writer.

Sequel 
A stand-alone sequel named Agantuker Pore was supposed to be in production, but has been shelved. Mamata Shankar, Deepankar De and Dhritiman Chatterjee were to reprise their roles from this film. Actor Abir Chatterjee was to play the role of the adult Satyaki. Payel Sarkar and Tridha Chowdhury were to be seen in important roles. It was supposed to be directed by Orko Sinha, who said the story would be completely different from the previous film.

References

External links 
Satyajitray.org on Agantuk
UCSC on Agantuk
Reviews of all of Ray's film including Agantuk

1991 films
Films directed by Satyajit Ray
Bengali-language Indian films
Films set in Kolkata
Films whose director won the Best Director National Film Award
Films scored by Satyajit Ray
Best Feature Film National Film Award winners
Films based on short fiction
Films with screenplays by Satyajit Ray
1990s Bengali-language films
National Film Development Corporation of India films